Chronic Lyme disease (CLD) is the name used by some people with "a broad array of illnesses or symptom complexes for which there is no reproducible or convincing scientific evidence of any relationship to Borrelia burgdorferi infection" to describe their condition and their beliefs about its cause.  Both the label and the belief that these people's symptoms are caused by this particular infection are generally rejected by medical professionals, and the promotion of chronic Lyme disease is an example of health fraud.  Chronic Lyme disease is distinct from genuine Lyme disease, a known medical disorder caused by infection with Borrelia burgdorferi, or with post-treatment Lyme disease syndrome, a set of lingering symptoms which may persist after successful treatment of infection with Lyme bacteria.

Despite numerous studies, there is no evidence that symptoms associated with CLD are caused by any persistent infection. The symptoms attributed to chronic Lyme are generic and non-specific symptoms, such as fatigue and muscle pain, and in many cases are likely due to fibromyalgia or chronic fatigue syndrome.  Fibromyalgia can be triggered by an infection, and antibiotics are not a safe or effective treatment for post-infectious fibromyalgia.

A number of alternative health products are promoted for chronic Lyme disease, of which possibly the most controversial and harmful is long-term antibiotic therapy, particularly intravenous antibiotics. Recognised authorities advise against long-term antibiotic treatment for Lyme disease, even where some symptoms persist post-treatment. Following disciplinary proceedings by state medical licensing boards in the United States, a subculture of "Lyme literate" physicians has successfully lobbied for specific legal protections, exempting them from the standard of care and science-based treatment guidelines. Such legislation has been criticised as an example of "legislative alchemy", the process whereby pseudomedicine is legislated into practice.

Description and background 

Chronic Lyme disease is distinct from untreated late-stage Lyme disease, which can cause arthritis, peripheral neuropathy and/or encephalomyelitis. Chronic Lyme disease is also distinct from the post-treatment Lyme disease syndrome (PTLDS), when symptoms linger after standard antibiotic treatments. PTLDS is estimated to occur in less than 5% of people who had Lyme disease and were treated. In contrast to these recognized medical conditions, the promotion of chronic lyme disease is a quintessential example of health fraud. In many cases there is no objective evidence that people who believe they have chronic Lyme have ever been infected with Lyme disease: standard diagnostic tests for infection are often negative.

While it is undisputed that people can have severe symptoms of an illness, the cause and appropriate treatment promoted by "chronic Lyme" advocates are controversial. The symptoms are similar to those of fibromyalgia or chronic fatigue syndrome.  Fibromyalgia can be triggered by an infection, and then persist when the infection is completely removed from the body.  A few doctors attribute these symptoms to persistent infection with Borrelia, or co-infections with other tick-borne pathogens, such as Ehrlichia and Babesia. Some conclude that the initial infection may cause an autoimmune reaction that continues to cause serious symptoms even after the bacteria have been eliminated by antibiotics.

A review looked at several animal studies that found persistence of live but disabled spirochetes following treatment of B. burgdorferi infection with antibiotics. The authors noted that none of the lingering spirochetes were associated with inflamed tissues and criticized the studies for not having considered adequately the different pharmacodynamics and pharmacokinetics of the antibiotics used to treat the animals in the trials versus what would be expected to be used to treat humans. The authors concluded, "There is no scientific evidence to support the hypothesis that such spirochetes, should they exist in humans, are the cause of post-Lyme disease syndrome."

Major US medical authorities, including the Infectious Diseases Society of America, the American Academy of Neurology, and the National Institutes of Health, have stated there is no convincing evidence that Borrelia is involved in the various symptoms classed as CLD, and particularly advise against long-term antibiotic treatment as it is ineffective and potentially harmful. Prolonged antibiotic therapy presents significant risks and can have dangerous, even deadly, side effects. Randomized placebo-controlled studies have shown that antibiotics offer no sustained benefit in people with chronic Lyme, with evidence of both placebo effects and significant adverse effects from such treatment. Many people who believe that they have chronic Lyme have fibromyalgia. Fibromyalgia can be difficult to treat, and antibiotics do not work at all for fibromyalgia.  A pressure group called the International Lyme and Associated Diseases Society (ILADS) says that the persistence of B. burgdorferi may be responsible for manifestations of chronic Lyme disease symptoms.

Identity 
Chronic Lyme can generally be explained as a misdiagnosis of fibromyalgia or chronic fatigue syndrome.  However, among people who self-identify as having chronic Lyme, the idea of chronic Lyme functions as a type of social identity.  In this sense, the goal of the label is not to identify particular objective facts that differentiate one medical condition from another; instead, the main goal is to validate the real suffering experienced by people living with an invisible illness and to provide social support for them as they cope with it.

Political actions 

While there is general agreement on the optimal treatment for Lyme disease, the existence of chronic Lyme is generally rejected because there is no evidence of its existence.  Even among those who believe in it, there is no consensus over its prevalence, symptoms, diagnostic criteria, or treatment. The evidence-based perspective is exemplified by a 2007 review in The New England Journal of Medicine, which noted the diagnosis of chronic Lyme disease is used by a few physicians despite a lack of "reproducible or convincing scientific evidence", leading the authors to describe this diagnosis as "the latest in a series of syndromes that have been postulated in an attempt to attribute medically unexplained symptoms to particular infections." Medical authorities agree with this viewpoint: the Infectious Diseases Society of America (IDSA), the American Academy of Neurology, the Centers for Disease Control and Prevention (CDC), and the National Institutes of Health (NIH), advise against long-term antibiotic treatment for people who identify as having chronic Lyme disease, given the lack of supporting evidence and the potential for harmful side-effects including toxicities.

A minority, primarily not medical practitioners, holds that chronic Lyme disease is responsible for a range of unexplained symptoms, sometimes in people without any evidence of past infection. This viewpoint is promoted by many who have been told they have the condition by people who lack experience in science or medicine. Groups, advocates, and the small number of physicians who support the concept of chronic Lyme disease have organized to lobby for recognition of this diagnosis, as well as to argue for insurance coverage of long-term antibiotic therapy, which most insurers deny, as it is at odds with the guidelines of major medical organizations.

Paul G. Auwaerter, director of infectious disease at Johns Hopkins School of Medicine, cited the political controversy and high emotions as contributing to a "poisonous atmosphere" around Lyme disease, which he believes has led to doctors trying to avoid having Lyme patients in their practices.

IDSA lawsuit 
In 2006, Richard Blumenthal, the Connecticut Attorney General, opened an antitrust investigation against the IDSA, accusing the IDSA Lyme disease panel of undisclosed conflicts of interest and of unduly dismissing alternative therapies and chronic Lyme disease. The investigation was closed on May 1, 2008, without charges when the IDSA agreed to submit to a review of its guidelines by a panel of independent scientists and physicians which would occur on July 30, 2009, citing mounting legal costs and the difficulty of presenting scientific arguments in a legal setting.

According to the agreement with Blumenthal, the IDSA Lyme disease guidelines remained in place and unchallenged. A Forbes piece described Blumenthal's investigation as "intimidation" of scientists by an elected official with close ties to Lyme advocacy groups. The Journal of the American Medical Association described the decision as an example of the "politicization of health policy" that went against the weight of scientific evidence and may have a chilling effect on future decisions by medical associations.

The expert panel's review was published in 2010, with the independent doctors and scientists in the panel unanimously endorsing the guidelines, stating "No changes or revisions to the 2006 Lyme guidelines are necessary at this time", and concluding long-term antibiotic treatments are unproven and potentially dangerous. The IDSA welcomed the final report, stating that "Our number one concern is the patients we treat, and we're glad patients and their physicians now have additional reassurance that the guidelines are medically sound."

Legal mandates to cover unproven treatments 
The state of Connecticut, meanwhile, enacted a law on June 18, 2009, "to allow a licensed physician to prescribe, administer or dispense long-term antibiotics for a therapeutic purpose to a patient clinically diagnosed with Lyme disease." The states of Rhode Island, California, Massachusetts, New Hampshire, Vermont, New York, Maine, and Iowa have similar laws.

Massachusetts (2016) and Rhode Island (2003) have laws mandating insurance coverage for long-term antibiotic therapy for Lyme disease when deemed medically necessary by a physician. In 1999 Connecticut had passed a similar, though somewhat more restrictive law.

Harassment of researchers 

In 2001, The New York Times Magazine reported that Allen Steere, chief of immunology and rheumatology at Tufts Medical Center and a co-discoverer and leading expert on Lyme disease, had been harassed, stalked, and threatened by patients and patient advocacy groups angry at his refusal to substantiate their diagnoses of "chronic" Lyme disease and endorse long-term antibiotic therapy. Because this intimidation included death threats, Steere was assigned security guards.

Media 

A 2004 study in The Pediatric Infectious Disease Journal stated nine of nineteen Internet websites surveyed contained what were described as major inaccuracies. Websites described as providing inaccurate information included several with the word "lyme" in their domain name (e.g., lymenet.org), as well as the website of the International Lyme and Associated Diseases Society. A 2007 article in The New England Journal of Medicine argued media coverage of chronic Lyme disease ignored scientific evidence in favor of anecdotes and testimonials:

The 2008 documentary film Under Our Skin: The Untold Story of Lyme Disease opened June 19, 2009, in New York City. The film, made by a director whose sister self-identified with the condition, is based on the premise that chronic Lyme disease exists. A columnist for Entertainment Weekly wrote of the film:

See also 
 List of diagnoses characterized as pseudoscience

References

External links
 

Medical controversies
Alternative diagnoses
 
Health fraud